is a passenger railway station located in  Kanagawa-ku, Yokohama, Kanagawa Prefecture, Japan, operated by the private railway company Keikyū.

Lines
Kanagawa Station is served by the Keikyū Main Line and is located 21.5 kilometers from the terminus of the line at Shinagawa  Station in Tokyo.

Station layout
Kanagawa Station is an elevated station with two opposed side platforms serving two tracks. The tracks are on embankments, with the station building underneath.

Platforms

History
The station opened on December 24, 1905, as a station on the Keihin Electric Railway. Six days later, it was renamed . The station was renamed Kanagawa Station on April 20, 1956. The platforms were lengthened in 1971, and a new station building was completed in February 1992.

Keikyū introduced station numbering to its stations on 21 October 2010; Kanagawa Station was assigned station number KK36.

Passenger statistics
In fiscal 2019, the station was used by an average of 4,751 passengers daily. 

The passenger figures for previous years are as shown below.

Surrounding area
 Aoki Bridge
Hongakuji Temple
Kogaya Park (Gongenyama Castle Ruins)
Yokohama City Kogaya Elementary School

See also
 List of railway stations in Japan

References

External links

 

Railway stations in Kanagawa Prefecture
Keikyū Main Line
Railway stations in Yokohama
Railway stations in Japan opened in 1905